Rcheulishvili is a Georgian surname. Notable people with the surname include:

 Guram Rcheulishvili (1934–1960), Georgian writer
 Vakhtang Rcheulishvili (1954–2017), Georgian politician and business executive

Georgian-language surnames